KF 2 Korriku (Klubi Futbollistik 2 Korriku Prishtinë) is a professional football club based in the city of Pristina, Kosovo. The club compete in the second tier of football in Kosovo Liga e Parë.

History

KF 2 Korriku won the Kosovo Cup in 1996. The club has the most popular football school in Kosovo. In the past 20 years since 1990 this school was the generator of extrodinary talents and in the Kosovo Super League almost every club has players from this school. Some famous players that went through the ranks of KF 2 Korriku are Etrit Berisha and Australian/Albanian Labinot Haliti.

Stadium
The club play their home games at the Fusha Sportive 2 Korriku in Pristina.

Players

Current squad

(Captain)

Affiliated clubs
  Beşiktaş J.K. (2021–present)

References

External links
 Official website

2 Korriku
Sport in Pristina
2 Korriku